Bianca Botto-Arias (born 6 June 1991) is a Peruvian former tennis player.

In her career, Botto won fifteen singles and five doubles titles on the ITF Circuit. On 20 April 2015, she achieved her career-high WTA singles ranking of No. 199. Her career-high in doubles is world No. 237, reached on 4 October 2010.

ITF Circuit finals

Singles: 22 (15 titles, 7 runner-ups)

Doubles: 6 (5 titles, 1 runner-up)

References

External links
 
 
 
Profil of Tennisexplorer

1991 births
Living people
Peruvian female tennis players
Sportspeople from Lima
Tennis players at the 2015 Pan American Games
Tennis players at the 2011 Pan American Games
Pan American Games competitors for Peru
South American Games bronze medalists for Peru
South American Games medalists in tennis
Competitors at the 2014 South American Games
21st-century Peruvian women